Horst is a surname and people with the surname include:

 Alexander Horst (born 1982), Austrian beach volleyball player
 César Horst (born 1989), Argentine football player
 David Horst (born 1985), American soccer player
 Deena Horst (born 1944), American politician
 Egon Horst (1938–2015), German football player
 Elizabeth K. Horst, American diplomat 
 Emil Clemens Horst (1867–1940), German-American hop farmer and inventor
 Hans Jacob Horst (1848–1931), Norwegian politician
 Heather Horst, American anthropologist
 Henry Horst (1836–1905), American politician
 Horst P. Horst (1906–1999), German-American fashion photographer
 Jacob Horst (born 1997), American weightlifter
 Jeremy Horst (born 1985), American baseball pitcher
 Jochen Horst (born 1961), Sri Lankan-born German actor
 Jon Horst (born 1983), American basketball manager 
 Jørn Lier Horst (born 1970), Norwegian author
 Louis Horst (1884–1964), American choreographer, composer, and pianist
 Marloes Horst (born 1989), Dutch fashion model
 Sandra Horst, Canadian pianist, vocal coach, and choral conductor
 Sarah Hörst (born 1982), American planetary scientist

See also
 Horst
 Horst (given name)

German-language surnames